Mount King George is located in Kluane National Park within Yukon Territory in Canada.  The mountain was named in 1935, along with the nearby Mount Queen Mary, for George V’s and Queen Mary's silver jubilee, or 25 years of rule.
The mountain's first published ascent was in 1966.  The results of a 1996 expedition to Mount King George have been published.

See also
 Mountain peaks of Canada
 Mountain peaks of North America

References

External links 
 Mount King George photo: Flickr

King George
Saint Elias Mountains